Kanjoos Makhichoos is an upcoming Indian Hindi-language comedy film directed by Vipul Mehta and produced by Soham Rockstar Entertainment along with ThunderSky Entertainment. The film is based on the famous Gujarati play Sajan Re Jhooth Mat Bolo. The film stars an Kunal Khemu, Shweta Tripathi, Piyush Mishra, Alka Amin, Rajeev Gupta and Raju Srivastava. The film is scheduled to release on March 24, 2023, on ZEE5. 
Kanjoos Makhichoos is comedian Raju Srivastav’s last movie appearance.

Plot 
Set in Lucknow, Kanjoos Makhichoos is a black comedy about a miserly person named Jamnaprasad Pandey who saves money to send his parents on a pilgrimage. However, fate has other plans when he loses his parents in a flood. Jamnaprasad Pandey is left distraught when he realises that the he would be receiving only half the compensation amount announced by the government due to middlemen and rampant corruption. The rest of the story follows several hilarious twists and turns as he fights against the corrupt system to get the rightful compensation.

Cast 
Kunal Khemu as Jamuna Prasad Pandey
Shweta Tripathi
Piyush Mishra
Alka Amin
Raju Srivastava
Rajiv Gupta

Production 
The shoots of the film started soon on September 10, 2021, on the occasion of Ganesh Chaturthi. The shoots were wrapped on Dusshera, 15 October 2021. The film was shot across Rishikesh and Lucknow.

Marketing 
The OTT release of Kanjoos Makhichoos was announced by Kunal Khemu when he shared the official poster of movie on social media. The trailer of the movie was released on March 13, 2023.

References

External links 
 
Kanjoos Makhichoos on ZEE5

Indian comedy films
2020s Hindi-language films